Mount Doorly is a summit surmounting the eastern part of the rocky ridge between Greenwood Valley and Wright Lower Glacier, in Victoria Land. It was discovered by the British National Antarctic Expedition, 1901–04, under Robert Falcon Scott, and named after Lieutenant Gerald S. Doorly, Royal Navy, of the Morning, a relief ship to the expedition.

Mount Doorly peaks at 891 metres (2923 ft) above sea level

References 

Mountains of Victoria Land
McMurdo Dry Valleys